The 2013–14 Ohio State Buckeyes women's basketball team will represent the Ohio State University during the 2013–14 NCAA Division I women's basketball season. The Buckeyes, led by first year head coach Kevin McGuff, play their home games at Value City Arena and were members of the Big Ten Conference. They finish with a record of 17–18 overall, 5–11 in Big Ten play for a 3-way tie finish for 8th place. They lost in the semifinals in the 2014 Big Ten Conference women's basketball tournament to Iowa.

Roster

Schedule

|-
!colspan=9 | Exhibition

|-
!colspan=9| Regular Season

|-
!colspan=9 | 2014 Big Ten Conference women's tournament

Source

See also
2013–14 Ohio State Buckeyes men's basketball team

References

Ohio State Buckeyes women's basketball seasons
Ohio State
Ohio State Buckeyes
Ohio State Buckeyes